Lewes Old Grammar School (LOGS) in Lewes, East Sussex, is an independent co-educational day school accredited by the Independent Schools Council.

History

An educational trust was established in the will of Agnes Morley who died in 1512; Lewes Old Grammar School has some historical links to that trust and thus might arguably be described as 'the 38th oldest school in England.' The school itself was proprietorial until 1989 when a new educational trust was formed, of which there were eight active trustees.  The current school has existed as an organisation since 25 April 2015, when the company limited by guarantee that now operates the school was formed.  As at 16 November 2018, ten directors of the company were listed at Companies House. 

In November 2017, the school was the subject of an emergency no-notice inspection by the Independent Schools Inspectorate in relation to regulatory failings or concerns raised as to the safeguarding of children. 

The school has been at the current school's site at the top of the Lewes High Street since the 19th century. Morley House, the junior school, which includes the Early Years and Foundation Stage (EYFS), is situated in a residential suburb, in a house which has been updated and extended. The senior school occupies three listed houses in the High Street of Lewes which have been refurbished and extended.

Curriculum
The Junior School, for ages 4–11, is housed in its own building, Morley House in King Henry's Road. The Senior School is situated in the centre of Lewes, occupying three former townhouses, Mead House, Tyne House and St. Clair House, all of which are grade II listed buildings. The curriculum followed includes three foreign languages (French, Spanish and German), and sciences are studied as individual subjects at senior level. Expansions to the sixth form college have allowed for the study of psychology, theatre and graphic design. They also allow the study of business, politics and Latin.

Extra-curricular activities
The sixth form produces theatrical events featuring the orchestra, choir and actors from the school. The most notable of these is the annual VIth form pantomime, performed on the last day of the autumn term. The last assembly of each academic year is primarily held and organised by the leaving upper VIth form.

School trips include the annual ski trip, a week spent at a sports training camp in Lanzarote, and every two years some members of the VIth form venture to Morocco for 10–11 days, visiting Marrakech, Zagora, and travelling into the High Atlas mountains to visit a school with which LOGS has been in contact with regularly. LOGS and the school have carried out exchanges, LOGS having several fundraising events in order to pay for travel from Morocco to the UK.

Every year the senior school carries out a sponsored charity walk, usually from the senior school in Lewes across some of the South Downs to Stanmer Park and back. One of the most popular charities is Fish Aid—a charity set up in memory of a former student of LOGS who died of cancer.

There are three houses in the school—DeMontfort house (green), Barbican house (red), and Malling house (blue). The houses compete in events throughout the year. Each house performs a Christmas pantomime before the VIth form pantomime on the last day of the Autumn Term.

External links
 Official website
 ISI Inspection Reports

Lewes
Private schools in East Sussex
1512 establishments in England
Educational institutions established in the 1510s
Member schools of the Independent Schools Association (UK)